The 1999 Swedish Figure Skating Championships were held in Örnsköldsvik from January 15 through 17th, 1999. Skaters competed in the disciplines of men's and ladies' singles, with the results among the selection criteria for the 1999 World Championships, the 1999 European Championships, and the 1999 World Junior Championships.

Senior results

Men

Ladies

External links
 results

Swedish Figure Skating Championships, 1999
Swedish Figure Skating Championships
Figure Skating Championships
Sports competitions in Örnsköldsvik